Child pornography (also called CP, child sexual abuse material, CSAM, child porn, or kiddie porn) is pornography that unlawfully exploits children for sexual stimulation. It may be produced with the direct involvement or sexual assault of a child (also known as child sexual abuse images) or it may be simulated child pornography. Abuse of the child occurs during the sexual acts or lascivious exhibitions of genitals or pubic areas which are recorded in the production of child pornography. Child pornography may use a variety of mediums, including writings, magazines, photos, sculpture, drawing, painting, animation, sound recording, video, and video games. Child pornography may be created for profit or other reasons.

Laws regarding child pornography generally include sexual images involving prepubescents, pubescent, or post-pubescent minors and computer-generated images that appear to involve them. Most possessors of child pornography who are arrested are found to possess images of prepubescent children; possessors of pornographic images of post-pubescent minors are less likely to be prosecuted, even though those images also fall within the statutes.

Prepubescent pornography is viewed and collected by pedophiles for a variety of purposes, ranging from private sexual uses, trading with other pedophiles, preparing children for sexual abuse as part of the process known as "child grooming", or enticement leading to entrapment for sexual exploitation such as production of new child pornography or child prostitution. Children themselves also sometimes produce child pornography on their own initiative or by the coercion of an adult.

Child pornography is illegal and censored in most jurisdictions in the world. Ninety-four of 187 Interpol member states had laws specifically addressing child pornography as of 2008, though this does not include nations that ban all pornography. Of those 94 countries, 58 criminalized possession of child pornography regardless of intent to distribute. Both distribution and possession are now criminal offenses in almost all Western countries. A wide movement is working to globalize the criminalization of child pornography, including major international organizations such as the United Nations and the European Commission. Producers of child pornography try to avoid prosecution by distributing their material across national borders, though this issue is increasingly being addressed with regular arrests of suspects from a number of countries occurring over the last decade.

Terminology

In the 2000s, use of the term child abuse images increased by both scholars and law enforcement personnel because the term "pornography" can carry the inaccurate implication of consent and create distance from the abusive nature of the material. A similar term, child sexual abuse material, is used by some official bodies, and similar terms such as "child abuse material", "documented child sexual abuse", and "depicted child sexual abuse" are also used, as are the acronyms CAM and CAI.  The term "child pornography" retains its legal definitions in various jurisdictions, along with related terms such as "indecent photographs of a child" and others.  In 2008, the World Congress III against the Sexual Exploitation of Children and Adolescents stated in their formally adopted pact that:Increasingly the term 'child abuse images' is being used to refer to the sexual exploitation of children and adolescents in pornography. This is to reflect the seriousness of the phenomenon and to emphasize that pornographic images of children are in fact records of a crime being committed.Interpol and policing institutions of various governments, including among others the United States Department of Justice, enforce child pornography laws internationally.  Since 1999, the Interpol Standing Working Group on Offenses Against Minors has used the following definition:  Child pornography is the consequence of the exploitation or sexual abuse perpetrated against a child. It can be defined as any means of depicting or promoting sexual abuse of a child, including print and/or audio, centered on sex acts or the genital organs of children.

Child sexual abuse in production and distribution

Abuse of the child occurs during the sexual acts or lascivious exhibitions of genitals or pubic areas which are recorded in the production of child pornography. Children of all ages, including infants, are abused in the production of child pornography. The United States Department of Justice estimates that pornographers have recorded the abuse of more than one million children in the United States alone. There is an increasing trend towards younger victims and greater brutality; according to Flint Waters, an investigator with the federal Internet Crimes Against Children Task Force, "These guys are raping infants and toddlers. You can hear the child crying, pleading for help in the video. It is horrendous." According to the World Congress against Commercial Sexual Exploitation of Children, "While impossible to obtain accurate data, a perusal of the child pornography readily available on the international market indicates that a significant number of children are being sexually exploited through this medium."<ref name="healty">{{cite web|url=http://www.csecworldcongress.org/PDF/en/Stockholm/Background_reading/Theme_papers/Theme%20paper%20Pornography%201996_EN.pdf |title=Child pornography: an international perspective, Margaret A. Healty, 1996 |url-status=dead |archive-url=https://web.archive.org/web/20080228232548/http://www.csecworldcongress.org/PDF/en/Stockholm/Background_reading/Theme_papers/Theme%20paper%20Pornography%201996_EN.pdf |archive-date=28 February 2008 }}</ref>

The United Kingdom children's charity NCH has stated that demand for child pornography on the Internet has led to an increase in sex abuse cases, due to an increase in the number of children abused in the production process.
In a study analyzing men arrested for child pornography possession in the United States over a one-year period from 2000 to 2001, 83% had pornographic images of prepubescent children and 80% had images graphically depicting sexual penetration. 21% had images depicting violence such as bondage, rape, or torture and most of those involved images of children who were gagged, bound, blindfolded, or otherwise enduring sadistic sex. 39% had child-pornography videos with motion and sound. 79% also had images of nude or semi-nude children, but only 1% possessed such images alone. Law enforcement found that 48% had more than 100 graphic still images, and 14% had 1,000 or more graphic images. 40% were "dual offenders", who sexually victimized children and possessed child pornography.

A 2007 study in Ireland, undertaken by the Garda Síochána, revealed the most serious content in a sample of over 100 cases involving indecent images of children. In 44% of cases, the most serious images depicted nudity or erotic posing, in 7% they depicted sexual activity between children, in 7% they depicted non-penetrative sexual activity between adults and children, in 37% they depicted penetrative sexual activity between adults and children, and in 5% they depicted sadism or bestiality.

Relation to child molestation and abuse

Experts differ over any causal link between child pornography and child sexual abuse, with some experts saying that it increases the risk of child sexual abuse, and others saying that use of child pornography reduces the risk of offending.Diamond, Milton. The Effects of Pornography: an international perspective, Pacific Center for Sex and Society", University of Hawai’i, 4 October 2009. Retrieved 8 June 2014.  A 2008 American review of the use of Internet communication to lure children outlines the possible links to actual behaviour regarding the effects of Internet child pornography.

According to one paper from the Mayo Clinic based on case reports of those under treatment, 30% to 80% of individuals who viewed child pornography and 76% of individuals who were arrested for Internet child pornography had molested a child. As the total number of those who view such images can not be ascertained, the ratio of passive viewing to molestation remains unknown. The report also notes that it is difficult to define the progression from computerized child pornography to physical acts against children. Several professors of psychology state that memories of child abuse are maintained as long as visual records exist, are accessed, and are "exploited perversely."

A study by Wolak, Finkelhor, and Mitchell states that:rates of child sexual abuse have declined substantially since the mid-1990s, a time period that corresponds to the spread of CP online. ... The fact that this trend is revealed in multiple sources tends to undermine arguments that it is because of reduced reporting or changes in investigatory or statistical procedures. ... [T]o date, there has not been a spike in the rate of child sexual abuse that corresponds with the apparent expansion of online CP.

Typology

In the late 1990s, the COPINE project ("Combating Paedophile Information Networks in Europe") at University College Cork, in cooperation with the Paedophile Unit of the London Metropolitan Police, developed a typology to categorize child abuse images for use in both research and law enforcement. The ten-level typology was based on analysis of images available on websites and internet newsgroups.
Other researchers have adopted similar ten-level scales.  In 2002 in the UK, the Sentencing Advisory Panel adapted the COPINE scale to five levels and recommended its adoption for sentencing guidelines, omitting levels 1 to 3 and recommending that levels 4 to 6 combine as sentencing level 1 and that the four levels from 7 to 10 each form an individual severity level, for a total of 5 sentencing stages.

Proliferation
Internet proliferation
Philip Jenkins notes that there is "overwhelming evidence that [child pornography] is all but impossible to obtain through nonelectronic means." The Internet has radically changed how child pornography is reproduced and disseminated, and, according to the United States Department of Justice, resulted in a massive increase in the "availability, accessibility, and volume of child pornography." The production of child pornography has become very profitable and is no longer limited to paedophiles.

Digital cameras and Internet distribution facilitated by the use of credit cards and the ease of transferring images across national borders has made it easier than ever before for users of child pornography to obtain the photographs and videos. The NCMEC estimated in 2003 that since 1997 the number of child pornography images available on the Internet had increased by 1500%.

In 2007, the British-based Internet Watch Foundation reported that child pornography on the Internet is becoming more brutal and graphic, and the number of images depicting violent abuse has risen fourfold since 2003. The CEO stated "The worrying issue is the severity and the gravity of the images is increasing. We're talking about prepubescent children being raped." About 80 percent of the children in the abusive images are female, and 91 percent appear to be children under the age of 12. Prosecution is difficult because multiple international servers are used, sometimes to transmit the images in fragments to evade the law. Some child pornographers also circumvent detection by using viruses to illegally gain control of computers on which they remotely store child pornography. In one case, a Massachusetts man was charged with possession of child pornography when hackers used his computer to access pornographic sites and store pornographic pictures without his knowledge. The U.S. Court of Appeals for the Tenth Circuit has ruled that if a user downloads child pornography from a file sharing network and possesses it in his "shared folder" without configuring the software to not share that content, he can be charged with distributing child pornography.

Regarding internet proliferation, the U.S. Department of Justice states that "At any one time there are estimated to be more than one million pornographic images of children on the Internet, with 200 new images posted daily." They also note that a single offender arrested in the U.K. possessed 450,000 child pornography images, and that a single child pornography site received a million hits in a month. Further, that much of the trade in child pornography takes place at hidden levels of the Internet, and that it has been estimated that there are between 50,000 and 100,000 paedophiles involved in organised pornography rings around the world, and that one third of these operate from the United States.

One massive international child pornography ring was centered in the Netherlands.  In the largest ever operation of its kind, police in 30 countries arrested 184 suspects and identified 486 others. Dutch authorities arrested 37-year-old Israeli-born Dutch citizen Amir Ish-Hurwitz, founder and owner of the internet forum Boylover.net, the center of the ring. At its peak, the forum had more than 70,000 members around the world.

For a brief time between April 2016 to September 2017 a dark web site known as "Childs Play" was active. Investigators later discovered that the site was run by a group of Australian police.

In 2008, the Google search engine adapted a software program in order to faster track child pornography accessible through their site. The software is based in a pattern recognition engine.

From 2017 to 2019, the Internet Watch Foundation said it found 118 videos of child sexual abuse (including child rape) on Pornhub. Pornhub quickly removed this content.

In 2019, the New York Times reported that child pornography was now a crisis. Tech companies such as Facebook, Microsoft and Dropbox reported over 45 million cases of child sexual abuse material which was more than double what was found the year before and 44 million more than in 2014.

In April 2020, BBC Three published a documentary and found that on a single day, a third of Twitter profiles globally advertising 'nudes4sale' (or similar) appeared to belong to underage individuals on various platforms, and many of those used OnlyFans to share their content.

Cybersex trafficking

Child victims of cybersex trafficking are forced into live streaming, pornographic exploitation on webcam which can be recorded and later sold. Victims are raped by traffickers or coerced to perform sex acts on themselves or other children while being filmed and broadcast in real time. They are frequently forced to watch the paying consumers on shared screens and follow their orders. It occurs in 'cybersex dens', which are rooms equipped with webcams. Overseas predators and pedophiles seek out and pay to watch the victims.

Collector behavior and motives
Viewers of child pornography who are pedophiles are particularly obsessive about collecting, organizing, categorizing, and labeling their child pornography collection according to age, gender, sex act and fantasy. According to FBI agent Ken Lanning,  "collecting" pornography does not mean that they merely view pornography, but that they save it, and "it comes to define, fuel, and validate their most cherished sexual fantasies." An extensive collection indicates a strong sexual preference for children, and if a collector of child pornography is also a pedophile, the owned collection is the single best indicator of what he or she wants to do.  The National Society for the Prevention of Cruelty to Children describes researchers Taylor and Quayle's analysis of pedophile pornography collecting:

These offenders are likely to employ elaborate security measures to avoid detection. The US DOJ notes that "there is a core of veteran offenders, some of whom have been active in pedophile newsgroups for more than 20 years, who possess high levels of technological expertise," also noting that pedophile bulletin boards often contain technical advice from child pornography users' old hands to newcomers."

A 1986 U.S. Senate report found that motives for people's collecting child pornography include arousal and gratification; validation and justification of pedophile behaviour; to show the images to children to lower their inhibitions to engage in sex; preservation of an image of a child at the age of sexual preference; blackmail of depicted individuals; a medium of exchange and communication with other child pornography consumers; and profit. A 2012 U.S. Sentencing Commission report found that child pornography offenders, while "much more likely to be sexually aroused by children than contact sex offenders or the general population", can also have non-sexual motives for collecting child pornography, including initial curiosity, compulsive collecting behaviors, avoidance of stress and dissatisfaction with life, and an ability to create a new and more socially successful identity (within an online community). Some offenders find collecting child pornography enjoyable regardless of whether the images are sexually exciting to them; their interest is in assembling complete sets and organizing the material as a pastime, analogously to what a stamp collector might do.

A study was published to the journal Child Abuse and Neglect in January 2021 by researchers at the University of Edinburgh and George Mason University that looked at the collecting and viewing behaviors of individuals previously convicted of child pornography offences in the United States. The researchers sent out a letter through the postal service to 78 previously convicted individuals and compared the results to the behaviors of 524 non-offending individuals in the United States. The study found that 78% of offenders did not organize their collection and 74% had deleted their entire collection at least once. Offenders also displayed a more diverse interest in adult pornography than non-offenders. They were more likely to view bestiality, hentai, teen and nudist material. They also found that none of the offenders viewed child pornography exclusively, with 74% saying they viewed more adult pornography than they did child pornography. Respondents also self-reported their post-conviction pornography viewing habits with 10% of respondents saying they continued to view child pornography post-conviction and at a lesser frequency than they had pre-conviction. The conclusion reached by the researchers is that treatment professionals should consider motivations of offenders beyond primarily pedophilic interests. They suggested that problematic internet usage, general pornography consumption, coping issues, and novelty seeking may be more appropriate motivators for some offenders.

Child sex tourism

Sex tourists created one source of child pornography that is distributed worldwide. Most of the victims of child sex tourism reside in the developing countries of the world. In 1996, a court in Thailand convicted a German national of child molestation and production of pornography for commercial purposes; he was involved in a child pornography ring which exploited Thai children. A sizable portion of the pornography seized in Sweden and in the Netherlands in the 1990s was produced by sex tourists visiting Southeast Asia. INTERPOL works with its 190 member countries to combat the problem, and launched its first-ever successful global appeal for assistance in 2007 to identify a Canadian man, Christopher Paul Neil, featured in a series of around 200 photographs in which he was shown sexually abusing young Vietnamese and Cambodian children.

Organized crime
Organised crime groups that produce and distribute pornography are often called "sex rings".  In 2003, an international police investigation uncovered a Germany-based child pornography ring involving 26,500 suspects who swapped illegal images on the Internet in 166 countries. In a 2006 case, US and international authorities charged 27 people in nine states and three countries in connection with a child pornography ring that US federal authorities described as "one of the worst" they have discovered. The assistant secretary for Immigration and Customs Enforcement added that the case reflected three larger trends that are becoming more common in child pornography rings. One is the increasing prevalence of "home-grown" pornographic images that are produced by predators themselves, and include live streaming video images of children being abused, not just the circulation of repeated images. Another trend is the growing use of sophisticated security measures and of peer-to-peer networking, in which participants can share files with one another on their computers rather than downloading them from a web site. The group used encryption and data destruction software to protect the files and screening measures to ensure only authorized participants could enter the chat room. A third trend is the increasingly violent and graphic nature of the images involving the abuse of younger children.

According to Jim Gamble, CEO of the Child Exploitation and Online Protection Centre, around 50 per cent of sites showing children being abused are operated on a pay-per-view basis. "The people involved in these sites often aren't doing it because they're deviant by nature. They're doing it because they're business people. It's risk versus profits. We need to reduce the profit motivation." The CEOPP was established in 2006, and targets the finances of organised criminal gangs selling images of child abuse.

The majority of child pornography seized in the United States is not produced or distributed for profit, and there is little evidence that organized criminals operating with a profit motivation are a major source of child pornography's international dissemination.

 Laws 

History
In the United States, the first federal law to ban the for-profit production and distribution of child pornography was the Protection of Children Against Sexual Exploitation Act of 1977. In response to New York v. Ferber, a U.S. Supreme Court decision allowing the prohibition of child pornography even if it did not meet the obscenity standard established in Miller v. California, Congress passed the Child Protection Act of 1984, broadening the definition of child pornography and criminalizing nonprofit child pornography trafficking. The 1986 Meese Report found that child pornography was a cause of serious harm; this led to the passage of the Child Sexual Abuse and Pornography Act of 1986, which increased penalties for repeat offenders.

The U.S. Supreme Court decision Osborne v. Ohio, ruled that the U.S. Constitution allowed prohibition of child pornography possession. The Court noted that at the time of the decision, 19 U.S. states had laws on their books prohibiting child pornography possession. As of 2015, all 50 U.S. states had such laws. Provisions of the Child Pornography Prevention Act of 1996 that banned virtual child pornography were struck down in Ashcroft v. Free Speech Coalition, . Congress passed several laws increasing the penalties for child pornography offenses, so that from 1997 to 2007, the mean sentence of child pornography offenders increased from 20.59 months to 91.30 months of confinement, an increase of 443%. In 2003, Congress passed the PROTECT Act, authorizing lifetime terms of federal supervised release for child pornography offenders; since U.S. Sentencing Guidelines recommend imposing the maximum term of supervised release for all sex offenders, this means that a lifetime term of supervised release is recommended for all child pornography offenders.

During 2006, 3,661 suspects were referred to U.S. attorneys for child sex exploitation offenses. Child pornography constituted 69% of referrals, followed by sex abuse (16%) and sex transportation (14%). In 2006, the median prison sentence imposed was greatest for sex abuse offenses (70 months) followed by child pornography (63 months) and sex transportation (60 months). The median sentenced for sex transportation was 60 months in 2006 and 1996. The median sentence increased from 44 to 70 months for sex abuse and from 15 to 63 months for child pornography. In comparison, median prison terms for drug and weapon offenders remained stable and increased for violent offenses.

A bill named Internet Safety Act, intended to stop child pornography and protect children from online predators by requiring Internet service providers to keep track of data pertaining to users that were assigned a temporarily assigned network address, was introduced in 2009 but was finally not enacted.

In fiscal year 2010, the average term of supervised release for non-production offenders was approximately 20 years; the average term of supervised release for offenders sentenced under the production guideline was nearly 27 years.

International coordination of law enforcement

Investigations include the 1999 Operation Cathedral which resulted in multi-national arrests and 7 convictions as well as uncovering 750,000 images with 1,200 unique identifiable faces being distributed over the web; Operation Amethyst which occurred in the Republic of Ireland; Operation Auxin which occurred in Australia; Operation Avalanche; Operation Ore based in the United Kingdom; Operation Pin; Operation Predator; the 2004 Ukrainian child pornography raids; and the 2007 international child pornography investigation. A three-year Europol investigation, dubbed Operation Rescue, based on the activities of boylover.net, a popular pedophile chat room, netted over 150 arrests and the rescue of 230 children in 2011. The principal of boylover.net, Israeli-born Dutch citizen Amir Ish-Hurwitz, was jailed 17 March 2011 in the Netherlands. Hundreds of additional suspects remain at large.

Even so, the UK based NSPCC said that worldwide an estimated 2% of child pornography websites still had not been removed a year after being identified.

One of the primary mandates of the international policing organization Interpol is the prevention of crimes against children involving the crossing of international borders, including child pornography and all other forms of exploitation and trafficking of children.

The USA Department of Justice coordinates programs to track and prosecute child pornography offenders across all jurisdictions, from local police departments to federal investigations, and international cooperation with other governments. Efforts by the Department to combat child pornography includes the National Child Victim Identification Program, the world's largest database of child pornography, maintained by the Child Exploitation and Obscenity Section of the United States Department of Justice and the National Center for Missing and Exploited Children (NCMEC) for the purpose of identifying victims of child abuse.CBS News, "Combating Kiddie Porn", 6 April 2003 Police agencies have deployed trained staff to track child pornography files and the computers used to share them as they are distributed on the Internet, and they freely share identifying information for the computers and users internationally.

In Europe the CIRCAMP Law Enforcement project is aimed at reducing the availability of abusive material on the Web, combining traditional police investigative methods and Police/Internet industry cooperation by blocking access to domains containing such files. The result is country specific lists according to national legislation in the participating countries. This police initiative has a worldwide scope in its work but is partly financed by the European Commission.

When child pornography is distributed across international borders, customs agencies also participate in investigations and enforcement, such as in the 2001–2002 cooperative effort between the United States Customs Service and local operational law enforcement agencies in Russia. A search warrant issued in the US by the Customs Service resulted in seizing of computers and email records by the Russian authorities, and arrests of the pornographers.

In spite of international cooperation, less than 1 percent of children who appear in child pornography are located by law enforcement each year, according to Interpol statistics.

Google announced in 2008 that it is working with NCMEC to help automate and streamline how child protection workers sift through millions of pornographic images to identify victims of abuse. Google has developed video fingerprinting technology and software to automate the review of some 13 million pornographic images and videos that analysts at the center previously had to review manually. However the technology behind Google's automated detection are known to raise false accusations. 

The FBI has begun posting hyperlinks on the Internet that purport to be illegal videos of minors having sex, and then raiding the homes of anyone willing to click on them.

In October 2011, hacking collective Anonymous announced they began taking down child pornography websites on the darknet in a vigilante move, and released alleged user names on a pastebin link.

National and international law

Child pornography laws provide severe penalties for producers and distributors in almost all societies, usually including incarceration, with shorter duration of sentences for non-commercial distribution depending on the extent and content of the material distributed. Convictions for possessing child pornography also usually include prison sentences, but those sentences are often converted to probation for first-time offenders.

In 2006, the International Centre for Missing & Exploited Children (ICMEC)  published a report of findings on the presence of child pornography legislation in the then-184 INTERPOL member countries.  It later updated this information, in subsequent editions, to include 196 UN member countries. The report, entitled "Child Pornography: Model Legislation & Global Review", assesses whether national legislation: (1) exists with specific regard to child pornography; (2) provides a definition of child pornography; (3) expressly criminalizes computer-facilitated offenses; (4) criminalizes the knowing possession of child pornography, regardless of intent to distribute; and (5) requires ISPs to report suspected child pornography to law enforcement or to some other mandated agency.

ICMEC stated that it found in its initial report that only 27 countries had legislation needed to deal with child pornography offenses, while 95 countries did not have any legislation that specifically addressed child pornography, making child pornography a global issue worsened by the inadequacies of domestic legislation. The 7th Edition Report found that still only 69 countries had legislation needed to deal with child pornography offenses, while 53 did not have any legislation specifically addressing the problem. Over seven years of research from 2006 to 2012, ICMEC and its Koons Family Institute on International Law and Policy report that they have worked with 100 countries that have revised or put in place new child pornography laws.Permanent Bureau (February 2004), "Strategic Plan Update, submitted by the Permanent Bureau", Hague Conference on Private International Law, Preliminary Document # 14, p. 6The Koons Family Institute on International Law and Policy (2012) "Child Pornography: Model Legislation & Global Review" , 7th Edition

A 2008 review of child pornography laws in 187 countries by the International Centre for Missing & Exploited Children (ICMEC) showed that 93 had no laws that specifically addressed child pornography. Of the 94 that did, 36 did not criminalize possession of child pornography regardless of intent to distribute.  This review, however, did not count legislation outlawing all pornography as being "specific" to child pornography. It also did not count bans on "the worst forms of child labor". Some societies such as Canada and Australia have laws banning cartoon, manga, or written child pornography and others require ISPs (Internet Service Providers) to monitor internet traffic to detect it.Canadian Arrested for Importing Loli-porn Manga (4 March 2005, Anime News Network). Retrieved 23 June 2008.

The United Nations Optional Protocol on the Sale of Children, Child Prostitution and Child Pornography requires parties to outlaw the "producing, distributing, disseminating, importing, exporting, offering, selling or possessing for the above purposes" of child pornography. The Council of Europe's Cybercrime Convention and the EU Framework Decision that became active in 2006 require signatory or member states to criminalize all aspects of child pornography. Article 34 of the United Nations Convention on the Rights of the Child (UNCRC) stated that all signatories shall take appropriate measures to prevent the exploitative use of children in pornographic performances and materials.

Artificially generated or simulated imagery

Simulated child pornography produced without the direct involvement of children in the production process itself includes modified photographs of real children, non-minor teenagers made to look younger (age regression), fully computer-generated imagery, and adults made to look like children. Drawings or animations that depict sexual acts involving children but are not intended to look like photographs may also be regarded as child pornography.

Sexting and filming among minors

Sexting is sending, receiving, or forwarding sexually explicit messages, photographs, or images, primarily between mobile phones, of oneself to others (such as dating partners or friends). It may also include the use of a computer or any digital device. Such images may be passed along to others or posted on the Internet. In many jurisdictions, the age of consent is lower than the age of majority, and a minor who is over the age of consent can legally have sex with a person of the same age. Many laws on child pornography were passed before cell phone cameras became common among teenagers close in age to or over the age of consent and sexting was understood as a phenomenon. Teenagers who are legally able to consent to sex, but under the age of majority, can be charged with production and distribution of child pornography if they send naked images of themselves to friends or sex partners of the same age.  The University of New Hampshire's Crimes Against Children Research Center estimates that 7 percent of people arrested on suspicion of child pornography production in 2009 were teenagers who shared images with peers consensually. Such arrests also include teenage couples or friends with a small age disparity, where one is a legal adult and the other is not. In some countries, mandatory sentencing requires anybody convicted of such an offense to be placed on a sex offender registry. 

The vast majority of underage sexual images are produced by adults and adults often solicit underage teenagers to share the images.

Legal professionals and academics have criticized the use of child pornography laws with mandatory punishments against teenagers over the age of consent for sex offenses. Florida cyber crimes defense attorney David S. Seltzer wrote of this that "I do not believe that our child pornography laws were designed for these situations ... A conviction for possession of child pornography in Florida draws up to five years in prison for each picture or video, plus a lifelong requirement to register as a sex offender."

In a 2013 interview, assistant professor of communications at the University of Colorado Denver, Amy Adele Hasinoff, who studies the repercussions of sexting has stated that the "very harsh" child pornography laws are "designed to address adults exploiting children" and should not replace better sex education and consent training for teens. She went on to say, "Sexting is a sex act, and if it's consensual, that's fine ... Anyone who distributes these pictures without consent is doing something malicious and abusive, but child pornography laws are too harsh to address it."

In April 2018, The Daily Telegraph'' reported that of the sexually explicit images of children and teenagers (11 to 15 year-olds) found on the Internet, 31% were made by children or teenagers from November 2017 to February 2018, with 40% in December 2017; 349 cases in January 2017 and 1717 in January 2018. The images were made by children or teenagers photographing or filming each other or as selfies, without adults present or coercing, by unwittingly imitating adult pornographic or nude images or videos (including of celebrities) that they had found on the Internet. The report said that sex offenders trawled for and amassed such images.

Organizations
There are many anti-child pornography organizations, such as the Financial Coalition Against Child Pornography, Association of Sites Advocating Child Protection, ECPAT International, and International Justice Mission.

See also

Child erotica
CIRCAMP
Circles of Support and Accountability
Color Climax Corporation
Commercial sexual exploitation of children
Debate regarding child pornography laws
Depictions of youth
FBI
Immigration and Customs Enforcement (ICE)
Internet Watch Foundation and Wikipedia
Interpol
Kompromat
Legal status of cartoon pornography depicting minors
Lolicon/Shotacon
Mobile Alliance Against Child Sexual Abuse Content
National Crime Agency (NCA)
Operation Blue Orchid
Operation Protect Our Children
Preadolescence
Prevention Project Dunkelfeld
Prostitution of children
Protect (political organization)
United States Postal Inspection Service
Virtuous Pedophiles
Relationship between child pornography and child sexual abuse

References

External links

 Oppenheimer, Mark, Part 2, Part 3, Part 4, Part 5
 Child Pornography Case Results in Lengthy Prison Sentences, FBI

 
Crimes
Pornography
Sex crimes
Online child abuse